Paul David Miller  (born February 7, 1951) is a politician in Ontario, Canada. He was a member of the Legislative Assembly of Ontario from 2007 provincial election until his defeat in the 2022 Ontario general election.

He represented the riding of Hamilton East—Stoney Creek
as an Ontario New Democratic Party MPP until March 17, 2022 when he was expelled from the party's caucus and barred from running again for the NDP. He sat the remainder of his term as an independent MPP and ran unsuccessfully as an independent in the June 2, 2022 election.

Background
Born in Hamilton, Miller's family moved to Stoney Creek when he was one year old. As a youth, he worked on the election campaigns of his uncle, former councillor and Hamilton Mayor, Bill Powell.

Miller worked for Hamilton Steel Hilton Works (formerly Stelco, now U.S. Steel Canada) as a mechanic-welder-fitter. While at Stelco he was a member of the United Steelworkers (USW), Local 1005. On behalf of the union, Miller served as a lobbyist on Parliament Hill and at Queen's Park, participating in 9 different campaigns.  Miller is the husband of Hamilton school trustee  Carole Paikin Miller. Miller is related to broadcaster Steve Paikin, a cousin to his wife.

Politics

Early political career
Miller served as a city councillor for two terms in Stoney Creek, Ontario from 1994 to 2000. During his time on council he chaired the Parks and Recreation committee and served as a member on several other committees. Miller contested the newly-created Ward 9 councillor's seat after the amalgamation of the City of Hamilton in 2000, but lost to the last mayor of Stoney Creek, Anne Bain. Following his loss, he remained active in politics, working for 2004 New Democratic Party federal candidate Tony DePaulo, and for 2006 NDP federal candidate and former Member of Parliament Wayne Marston.

First terms at Queen's Park
On July 12, 2007, he was nominated to run in Hamilton East—Stoney Creek in the 2007 Ontario general election. Miller campaigned on a platform of job retention and a promise to push for an increase in the minimum wage. He defeated Hamilton city councillor Sam Merulla for the NDP nomination. Miller defeated Liberal candidate Nerene Virgin.

In April 2008, Miller introduced a private member's bill that proposed to create a severance fund for workers who were owed money when their companies closed. The fund would be used to cover severances, vacation pay and other items owed to workers. Miller said, "It would allow people ... to have a little bit of a nest egg to hold them over until they get retrained or find another job." The proposed fund which would have been financed by existing companies was criticized by Labour Minister Brad Duguid, who said the fund was "nothing short of a payroll tax" and that it was "irresponsible in this economy to jack up taxes on businesses, in particular in the manufacturing sector." The proposed bill was shelved by a government committee.

In 2010, Miller introduced another private member's bill called the Eramosa Karst Feeder Lands Protection Act, 2010 that would protect land near the Eramosa Karst formation. Though he was a member of the NDP, Miller introduced the bill jointly with Niagara West-Glanbrook MPP (and Ontario PC Party leader) Tim Hudak. The bill proposed to permanently protect land occupied by streams that feed into the karst formation. The land owned by the Ontario Realty Corporation was designated for possible residential development. Miller called the lands a "geological wonder". He said, "These lands are the lifeline for the Eramosa Karst... we must move now to preserve the Eramosa Karst feeder lands." The bill was passed into law in the spring of 2011.

In 2013, Miller was at the centre of a controversy within Queen's Park when Ontario NDP Leader Andrea Horwath sent Paul Miller to the back bench after a dispute between the two politicians.

Miller was re-elected in the 2011, and 2014 provincial elections.

Miller served as the party's critic for Tourism, Culture and Sport and for the 2015 Pan and Parapan American Games.

In 2016, Miller advanced a bill that would look at the costs of living in various economic regions in Ontario, provide education around social assistance rates, and examine unsafe working conditions in the province. While the bill's progress was terminated upon the prorogation of the Ontario legislature in September 2016, Miller immediately re-introduced the bill upon the legislature's return.

Growing controversies
In 2018, questions were raised about Miller's future in Ontario provincial politics after a series of allegations of bullying, racist remarks, and abuse of office resources.  The same year, a voice recording was released that showed Miller criticizing unions for doing more harm than good after it was reported that he had criticized the loyalty of an employee who took parental leave.

A Human Rights complaint was filed against Miller in April 2018.  A statement to the Human Rights Tribunal of Ontario claimed Miller regularly displayed sexist, racist and homophobic behaviour.

In Ontario's 2018 election, Miller was able to claim his 4th victory in his Hamilton East-Stoney Creek Riding with more than 51 percent of the overall vote.

Expulsion from the NDP
On March 17, 2022 the party announced he would be disallowed from running in the 2022 Ontario general election and was removed from the party's caucus because he was member of an Islamophobic Facebook group.

Miller rejected the claims against him and filed a legal suit against the Ontario NDP. The $1.3-million breach of contract claim against the NDP, Leader Andrea Horwath and two party officials, filed in a Hamilton court, alleges the Ontario NDP, Horwath and officials Lucy Watson and Michael Balagus, conspired to remove Miller from the caucus by knowingly using a false allegation.

Miller subsequently announced his intention to run as an Independent in the province's 2022 election. He placed fourth, earning 6.7% of the vote and losing to Progressive Conservative challenger Neil Lumsden.

Bills Sponsored in Ontario Legislature

Receiving Royal Assent

Critic Roles

Electoral record 

 

		

		

|- 
!rowspan="2" colspan="2" |Candidate
!colspan="3"  |Popular vote
|- 
! Votes
! %
! ±%
|-
| style="background-color:#FF0800;" |
| style="text-align:left;" | Anne Bain
| style="text-align:right;" |2,703	
| style="text-align:right;" |35.87%
| style="text-align:right;" |
|-
| style="background-color:#FF7E00;" |
| style="text-align:left;" | Paul Miller
| style="text-align:right;" |2,631
| style="text-align:right;" |35.78%
| style="text-align:right;" | -
|-
| style="background-color:#0047AB;" |
| style="text-align:left;" | Bob Charters
| style="text-align:right;" |2,201
| style="text-align:right;" |29.21%
| style="text-align:right;" | -
|-
| style="text-align:right;background-color:#FFFFFF;" colspan="2" |Total votes
| style="text-align:right;background-color:#FFFFFF;" |7,535
| style="text-align:right;background-color:#FFFFFF;" |100%
| style="text-align:right;background-color:#FFFFFF;" |
|- 
| style="text-align:right;background-color:#FFFFFF;" colspan="2" |Registered voters
| style="text-align:right;background-color:#FFFFFF;" |17,306
| style="text-align:right;background-color:#FFFFFF;" |43.54%
| style="text-align:right;background-color:#FFFFFF;" |
|- 
| style="text-align:left;" colspan="6" |Note: All Hamilton Municipal Elections are officially non-partisan.  Note: Candidate campaign colours are based on the prominent colour used in campaign items (signs, literature, etc.)and are used as a visual differentiation between candidates.
|- 
| style="text-align:left;" colspan="13" |Sources: 
|}

References

External links
 
 

1951 births
Trade unionists from Ontario
Living people
Ontario municipal councillors
Ontario New Democratic Party MPPs
Politicians from Hamilton, Ontario
United Steelworkers people
21st-century Canadian politicians
Politicians affected by a party expulsion process